Pashupati Nath Singh (born 11 July 1949) is an Indian politician belonging to Bharatiya Janata Party. He is a member of the Indian Parliament, and currently represents Dhanbad (Lok Sabha constituency).

References

1949 births
Living people
India MPs 2009–2014
People from Dhanbad
Lok Sabha members from Jharkhand
India MPs 2014–2019
Bharatiya Janata Party politicians from Jharkhand
India MPs 2019–present